Alla Salaeva (September 14, 1979, Cheboksary) is a Russian political figure and deputy of the 8th State Duma. From 2003 to 2012, Salaeva worked at the department of culture at the Cheboksary city administration. From 2012 to 2020, she was the vice-president of social affairs. On September 23, 2020, Salaeva was appointed acting head of the Ministry of Education of the Chuvashia. On November 9, 2020, she became the vice-president of the Republic's Ministry of Education and Youth Policy. Since September 2021, she has served as deputy of the 8th State Duma.

References

1979 births
Living people
United Russia politicians
21st-century Russian politicians
Eighth convocation members of the State Duma (Russian Federation)